Araripesuchus is a genus of extinct crocodyliform that existed during the Cretaceous period of the late Mesozoic era some 125 to 66 million years ago. Six species of Araripesuchus are currently known. They are generally considered to be notosuchians (belonging to the clade Mesoeucrocodylia), characterized by their varied teeth types and distinct skull elements. This genus consists of six species: A. buitreraensis, discovered in Argentina, A. wegeneri, discovered in Cameroon and Niger, A. rattoides, discovered in Niger, A. tsangatsangana, discovered in Madagascar, A. gomesii (the type species), discovered in Brazil and another species discovered in Argentina, A. patagonicus.

Description
Araripesuchus can be distinguished by their laterally bulged edges of the snout, with the bulge being the most prominent around the area of an enlarged maxillary tooth. The snout and premaxilla are also smoother than that of most crocodyliforms, without foramina or the typical rugose texture. There are six valid species within this genus, all with slightly differing maxillary or dentary structure. A. gomesii, A. wegeneri and A. tsangatsangana all have a mild concavity of the external alveolar margin of the premaxilla as viewed from the ventral surface; A. rattoides may also have this feature, although this part of its skull is not known, as the dentary suggests that this would be the case. A. rattoides also had the distinctive feature of a highly enlarged and forward-pointing first dentary tooth referred to as an incisiform, resembling the elongated incisors found in rodents (hence the specific epithet).

All species of Araripesuchus had relatively large orbits and hence eyes. They also had thin osteoderms that covered the entire body, multiple rows of them across the back and paired dorsal ones along the tail. Each side of the tail also had a single row of osteoderms, and there were paired ventral osteoderms across most of the belly and underside as well. The osteoderms were not strongly keeled, which, along with the long limb bones and shoulder, hip and ankle joints that suggest upright posture, indicate that Araripesuchus was probably more active on land than on water.

Discovery and history
 
The name of the genus was coined in 1959 with the description of the type species Araripesuchus gomesii, a notosuchian crocodylian from the famed Santana Group of the Araripe Basin in Brazil. The holotype used to describe the genus, 423-R is currently in the care of the Divisão de Mineralogia e Geologia do Departamento Nacional da Produção Mineral in Rio de Janeiro. 423-R consists of a single skull articulating with part of a lower jaw. A more complete specimen, AMNH 24450 is held by the American Museum of Natural History. A second species, A. wegeneri was described in 1981. This species was discovered from Early Cretaceous deposits of Niger on the African continent, as opposed to the South American paleodistribution of the other species in the genus. The type specimen for the species, GDF-700 consisting of a few, fragmentary jaw elements, reside at the Museum National d'Histoire Naturelle in Paris. The holotype's fragmentary nature meant that its placement in the genus was disputed until more remains were found in 2009 by Sereno and Larsson; these, along with the specimens of A. tsangatsangana, confirmed its place.

Araripesuchus patagonicus was described from a patagonian specimen (MUC-PV 269) in 2000. Another species to be assigned to the genus, was Araripesuchus buitreraensis, described in 2005. This species was described from a single skull (MPCA-PV 235) retrieved from Late Cretaceous deposits in what is now Argentina. At 130 millimeters, the skull is the largest Araripesuchus specimen discovered to date. A fifth species, Araripesuchus tsangatsangana was described in 2006. This species' type specimen was discovered from latest Late Cretaceous deposits from the African island of Madagascar. Analysis of this specimen solidifies the position of A. wegneri as a member of the genus. A. tsangatsangana is the geologically youngest known of this genus. The sixth species, A. rattoides, was found in the Kem Kem Beds of the Sahara in a similar location to the specimens of A. wegeneri found by Sereno and Larsson, and is known only from parts of dentary bones, up to the fourteenth alveolus. It was described in the same paper as Kaprosuchus, Laganosuchus and Anatosuchus; the four were therefore popularized by the authors as 'RatCroc', 'BoarCroc', 'PancakeCroc' and 'DuckCroc' respectively.

Classification
 
There are currently six recognized species within the genus Araripesuchus: A. patagonicus, A. buitreraensis, A. tsangatsangana, A. wegeneri, A. rattoides and the type species A. gomesii. The placement of the first African species discovered, A. wegeneri was questioned for a while by various authors. Ortega et al. argued for the assignment of the errant species to another genus based on phylogenetic analysis Further analysis, combined with the discovery of the second African species A. tsangatsangana has shed more light on the placement of A. wegeneri within the genus. When analyzed together, the African species support the inclusion of all five first described species into the same genus.

The genus was originally assigned by Price to the family Uruguaysuchidae in the original 1959 description. This classification was followed by Buffetaut in 1981 with the description of A. wegeneri also within the same family. However, in their 2000 description of A. patagonicus, Ortega et al. avoided placing the species within the family. Instead, it was simply noted that Uruguaysuchus was a possible close relative of the genus.

Ortega et al. and several other studies place Araripesuchus outside Notosuchia. In some phylogenetic analyses, it is placed closer to the clade Neosuchia, which includes modern crocodilians. In most recent analyses, however, Araripesuchus is placed as a basal notosuchian. The phylogenetic analysis of Soto et al. (2011) joined Araripesuchus with Uruguaysuchus, reinstating the family Uruguaysuchidae. This family was found to be the most basal group of Notosuchia. Below is a cladogram from the analysis:

Paleoecology
 
Araripesuchus remains have been recovered from the continents of South America and Africa suggesting a Gondwanan origin for the evolution of the genus. At around the time of Araripesuchus'  existence, South America and Africa were physically adjacent to each other. The various species evolved from the same stock in the general area, radiating outward from a yet-unidentified origin point. The presence of specimens from Madagascar further strengthens this evolutionary radiation model.

References

External links

Uruguaysuchids
Terrestrial crocodylomorphs
Early Cretaceous crocodylomorphs of South America
Late Cretaceous crocodylomorphs of South America
Cretaceous Argentina
Fossils of Argentina
Cretaceous Brazil
Fossils of Brazil
Early Cretaceous crocodylomorphs of Africa
Late Cretaceous crocodylomorphs of Africa
Crocodylomorphs of Madagascar
Maevarano fauna
Cretaceous Cameroon
Fossils of Cameroon
Cretaceous Malawi
Fossils of Malawi
Cretaceous Morocco
Fossils of Morocco
Cretaceous Niger
Fossils of Niger
Cretaceous Tunisia
Fossils of Tunisia
Fossil taxa described in 1959
Prehistoric pseudosuchian genera